Coca-Cola Raspberry is a Coca-Cola drink with a raspberry flavor that was sold in New Zealand on a trial basis. A "Diet Coke Raspberry" version was also sold. Both were first introduced on June 1, 2005, and had been discontinued by the end of the year. 
In the summer of 2017, the drink was brought back in New Zealand for a limited release. It was reintroduced as a summer flavor in Australia.

In August 2018 Raspberry was offered as a zero sugar flavor in Finland and Norway, this flavor was further launched in the UK in January 2019. Raspberry was also offered by REMA 1000 in Denmark as Zero Sugar flavor and was disconnected and replaced by Coke Lemon Zero Sugar in October same year, In 600ml bottles in Taiwan as of as early as 2019. A similar version, California Raspberry, was released in 2019. Coca-Cola Raspberry released at the end of 2019 in Sweden and is only available as the zero sugar flavor. In 2021, Coca-Cola Raspberry became available in the Netherlands and Belgium.

Vending machine availability
Raspberry was the third flavor added to original Coke in New Zealand. The others are vanilla coke and cherry coke.  Raspberry Coke was initially posted on US auction sites, with bottles selling in the $10 US dollar range. It is now generally no longer available and would be considered extremely rare and collectable. , remaining supplies have been exhausted and are not available for sale via online auctions or retail outlets. The only remaining place that Coca-Cola Raspberry can be found is in Coca-Cola Freestyle touch-screen soda fountains. It is also available in selected Burger King restaurants in the UK. Raspberry Coke was a popular flavor available in Australia through Summer 2017–18 along with 'Coffee Coke' and 'Ginger Coke'.

See also
Diet Coke

References

External links
 

Coca-Cola brands
Discontinued soft drinks
New Zealand drinks
Food and drink introduced in 2005
Raspberry